Lake George is an unincorporated community and a U.S. Post Office in Park County, Colorado, United States.  The Lake George Post Office has the ZIP Code 80827. It lies along U.S. Highway 24 northwest of Colorado Springs, and several miles north of Florissant Fossil Beds National Monument.

History

The town and nearby lake—to its west and fed by the South Platte River—The man made lake was built by George Frost for the purpose of supplying ice to the railroad. The lake, originally called George's Lake was later changed to Lake George when the post office opened. The lake itself freezes mostly solid in the wintertime, which made it ideal for railroad men to cut large blocks of ice from it in order to keep perishables cool. A privately owned ice company here supplied the needs of much of the Pikes Peak region. Ice cut during the winter was shipped on the CM to both Colorado Springs and the Cripple Creek, Colorado district. Also related to the town's railroading history, a short walk into the surrounding hills reveals Chinese bread ovens, from the period their labor was imported. At the turn of the century the community's population was 30.ref name="cafky"/> After 1900 some farmers and ranchers nearby began raising high-altitude potatoes on a limited scale. This furnished the CM with some additional traffic.ref name="cafky"/> However, the CM closed in August 1918. Other railways then provided service to certain shippers along the otherwise idle CM railway. Up to that time this had been the shortest rail route through the mountains. Keeping the track open during winter proved expensive, and when the mining of ore dwindled, the tracks were torn up. U.S. Route 24 follows the abandoned grade of the CM railway. By 1941 the community had grown to 100 persons and was the center of an extensive potato growing area. The community's population in 1965 was 100.<ref name

In 1995, the Orthodox Church in America female monastic community of Protection of the Holy Virgin moved from Calhan to Lake George, establishing a 10.3 acre monastery. In 1999, the monastery purchased an adjacent lot of 3.5 acres and add it to the monastery's grounds. The community publishes Eastern Orthodox Christian prayer books and hosts public Divine Services.

The just under- Hayman Fire, the largest fire in Colorado's recorded history, was started near Lake George on June 8, 2002.

A tornado caused minor damage in the Lake George area on Aug. 18, 2009. An additional tornado caused damage to cabins in 2014.

Geography
Lake George is located at  (38.980229,-105.357685).

Nearby is Camp Alexander, the Scout camp for Pikes Peak Council, as well as the Elevenmile Reservoir. Also nearby, an original homestead still stands, a remnant from potato farmers. It’s now a dude ranch called the M Lazy C Guest Ranch.

Climate
According to the Köppen Climate Classification system, Lake George has a cold semi-arid climate, abbreviated "BSk" on climate maps.

See also

References

External links

Unincorporated communities in Park County, Colorado
Unincorporated communities in Colorado